Doherty (Irish: O'Dochartaigh) may refer to:

People
 Doherty (surname), a list of notable people with the surname "Doherty"
 O'Doherty, a list of notable people with the surname "O'Doherty"
 O'Doherty family, an Irish clan

Places and schools
 Doherty, Ontario, an unincorporated place and railway point in Ontario, Canada
 Doherty House, a historic house in Hot Springs, Arkansas, United States
 Doherty Memorial High School, in Worcester, Massachusetts, United States
 Doherty School, in Cincinnati, Ohio, United States 
 Doherty Slide, a prominent dissected volcanic rim in Oregon, United States
 Lamont–Doherty Earth Observatory, a research center in Palisades, New York, United States 
 Thomas B. Doherty High School, in Colorado Springs, Colorado, United States

Science and technology
 Doherty amplifier, a modified class B radio-frequency amplifier
 Doherty's bushshrike (Telophorus dohertyi), a species of bird
 Mordellistena doherty, a species of beetle

Other
 , a US Navy destroyer escort
 Breaking Up with Shannen Doherty, an American reality television series
 Brown & Doherty Ltd v Whangarei County Council, a New Zealand legal case regarding quantum meruit
 Immigration and Naturalization Service v. Doherty, a 1992 United States Supreme Court case
 Stalking Pete Doherty, a rockumentary by Max Carlis

See also
 Dohertya, a genus of moths in the subfamily Arctiinae
 Dohertyorsidis, a genus of longhorn beetles of the subfamily Lamiinae